The 2010–11 women's national hockey team represented the United States in various tournaments during the season. The team won the gold medal at the Women's World Championships. The head coach of the National team was Mark Johnson.

Offseason
On September 22, 2010, Olympic silver medallist Jinelle Zaugg and current US goaltender Jessie Vetter threw out the ceremonial first pitch at Miller Park before the Milwaukee Brewers/Cincinnati Reds game.

News and notes
On December 16, 2010, former USA Hockey player Karyn Bye was selected to the International Ice Hockey Federation Hall of Fame Class of 2011.
January 19, 2011: The city of Burlington, Vermont has been selected to host the 2012 IIHF Women's World Ice Hockey championships.
March 25, 2011: Jinelle Zaugg announced her retirement from the U.S. Women's National Program.

Senior team
The first tournament for the US team in the season will be the 2010 Four Nations Cup.

Four Nations Cup

Roster

Holiday Camp
Forty players were invited take part in the 2010 USA Hockey Women's Winter Training Camp. The camp was held from December 26 to 31 in Blaine, Minnesota. The six-day camp will serve as a tryout and training session for the U.S. Women's National Team. The coaching staff for the camp includes Katey Stone, head coach at Harvard University, Mark Hudak, head coach at Dartmouth College, and Hilary Witt, women's ice hockey assistant coach at Northeastern.
December 21: Freshman goaltender Kerrin Sperry of the Boston University Terriers women's ice hockey program has been added to the roster for the 2010 USA Hockey Women's Winter Training Camp.

Roster

IIHF World Championships
The USA Women's National Team will attempt to repeat as gold medal winners as they compete in the 2011 Women's World Ice Hockey Championships in Switzerland. A total of 30 players  were invited to the selection training camp in Ann Arbor, Michigan, from April 4–12, with the final 21-player roster set for the USA Women's National Team to be announced on April 9. Also USA will play a pair of games against Canada on April 7 and 8 in Michigan. Hilary Knight (Hanover, N.H.) scored the game-winning goal at 7:48 of overtime as the U.S. Women’s National Team won its third consecutive world title with a 3-2 overtime victory against Canada at the 2011 International Ice Hockey Federation World Women's Championship at Hallenstadion. Jessie Vetter made 51 saves in the championship-winning effort.

Notes
On the 30 player preliminary roster, Alexandra Carpenter is the youngest player on the roster. The only players who have not competed in an Olympics, World Championship or World U18 Championship are Josephine Pucci and Jen Schoullis. Katey Stone will serve as the head coach and will be assisted by Mark Hudak from Dartmouth and Hilary Witt of Northeastern.

Roster

Schedule
All times local (CEST/UTC+2)

Under 22 team
The team will participate in both the 2010 USA Hockey Women's National Festival and the 2010 Under-22 Series. The Women's National Festival will run from August 13–21 at the Olympic Center in Lake Placid, N.Y. The U-22 team will depart the Festival early and travel to Toronto to compete in the three-game Under-22 Series against Canada from August 18–21.

Roster

Team Canada series

Under 18 team
Scoring leaders 2011 IIHF World Women's U18 Championship
GP = Games played; G = Goals; A = Assists; Pts = Points; +/− = Plus/minus; PIM = Penalties in minutes; POS = Position

Roster

2011 Winter Universiade

Team Roster
Following is the 2011 United States Women's National University Team, which will be representing the United States in the ice hockey competition:

''A - Alternate

Round-robin results

Semifinals

Awards and honors
Directorate Award: Best Defenseman, 2011 IIHF World Women's U18 Championship, Milica McMillen
Directorate Award: Best Forward, 2011 IIHF World Women's U18 Championship, Alex Carpenter

See also
 2009–10 United States women's national ice hockey team
 United States women's national ice hockey team

References

External links
 Women's Hockey pages on Hockey Federation website

United States Women's National Ice Hockey Team, 2010-11
United States Women's National Ice Hockey Team, 2010-11
United States women's national ice hockey team
Nat